Moschovakis is a surname. Notable people with the surname include:

 Anna Moschovakis, American poet, author, and translator
 Joan Moschovakis (born 1937), American logician and mathematician
 Yiannis N. Moschovakis (born 1938), American logician